Kevin Patrick Curran (31 August 1928 – 23 August 2017) was a Rhodesian cricketer. He played seven first-class cricket matches for Rhodesia between 1947 and 1955. His son, Kevin, played One Day Internationals (ODIs) for the Zimbabwe national cricket team, and his grandsons, Tom and Sam, have played international cricket for England.

References

External links
 

1928 births
2017 deaths
Zimbabwean cricketers
Rhodesia cricketers
Sportspeople from Kadoma, Zimbabwe
Kevin